Jakub Majerski (born 18 August 2000) is a Polish swimmer. He competed in the mixed 4 × 100 metre medley relay at the 2020 Summer Olympics.

References

External links
 

2000 births
Living people
Polish male butterfly swimmers
Olympic swimmers of Poland
Swimmers at the 2020 Summer Olympics
Place of birth missing (living people)
Swimmers at the 2018 Summer Youth Olympics
21st-century Polish people
European Aquatics Championships medalists in swimming